Duolandrevus is a genus of crickets in the subfamily Landrevinae and tribe Landrevini.  Species can be found in Asia.

Species 
Duolandrevus includes the following species, with eight identified subgenera:

 subgenus Bejorama Otte, 1988
Duolandrevus aequatorialis Gorochov, 2003
Duolandrevus balabacus Otte, 1988
Duolandrevus bonus Gorochov, 2005
Duolandrevus deliensis Gorochov, 2000
Duolandrevus doloduo Gorochov, 2016
Duolandrevus firmus Gorochov, 2000
Duolandrevus gingoogus Otte, 1988
Duolandrevus improvisus Gorochov & Warchalowska-Sliwa, 2004
Duolandrevus intermedius Chopard, 1969
Duolandrevus krabi Gorochov, 2000
Duolandrevus lambir Gorochov, 2017
Duolandrevus luzonensis Otte, 1988
Duolandrevus modestus Gorochov & Warchalowska-Sliwa, 2004
Duolandrevus mostovskyi Gorochov, 2000
Duolandrevus obliteratus Gorochov, 2016
Duolandrevus parvulus Gorochov, 2016
Duolandrevus praestans Gorochov, 2003
Duolandrevus soekarandae Gorochov, 2000
 subgenus Duolandrevus Kirby, 1906 (synonym Sutepia Otte, 1988)
Duolandrevus balikpapan Gorochov, 2016
Duolandrevus bannanus Zhang, Liu & Shi, 2017
Duolandrevus bengkulu Gorochov, 2016
Duolandrevus brachypterus (Haan, 1844) – type species (as Gryllus brachypterus Haan; locality: Soekaboemi [Sukabumi], Java)
Duolandrevus coulonianus (Saussure, 1877)
Duolandrevus curup Gorochov, 2016
Duolandrevus kalimantan Gorochov, 2016
Duolandrevus karnyi Otte, 1988
Duolandrevus kubah Gorochov, 2016
Duolandrevus lampung Gorochov, 2016
Duolandrevus manna Gorochov, 2016
Duolandrevus matang Gorochov, 2017
Duolandrevus pendleburyi Otte, 1988
Duolandrevus rufus Chopard, 1931
Duolandrevus sabah Gorochov, 2016
Duolandrevus selatan Gorochov, 2016
Duolandrevus spinicauda Gorochov, 2016
Duolandrevus sulawesi (Gorochov, 2000)
Duolandrevus sympatricus Gorochov, 2016
Duolandrevus thailandicus (Otte, 1988)
 subgenus Eulandrevus Gorochov, 1988
Duolandrevus axinus Zhang, Liu & Shi, 2017
Duolandrevus borneo Gorochov, 2016
Duolandrevus coriaceus (Shiraki, 1930)
Duolandrevus dendrophilus (Gorochov, 1988)
Duolandrevus enatus (Gorochov, 1990)
Duolandrevus gorochovi Zhang, Liu & Shi, 2017
Duolandrevus guntheri (Gorochov, 1988)
Duolandrevus hainanensis Liu, He & Ma, 2015
Duolandrevus infuscatus Liu & Bi, 2010
Duolandrevus ishigaki Otte, 1988
Duolandrevus ivani (Gorochov, 1988)
Duolandrevus kawataredoki Tan & Wahab, 2017
Duolandrevus major Otte, 1988
Duolandrevus megararus Gorochov, 2016
Duolandrevus microrarus Gorochov, 2016
Duolandrevus namlik Gorochov, 2017
Duolandrevus paradoxus (Gorochov, 2001)
Duolandrevus rarus Gorochov, 1996
Duolandrevus sonorus (Gorochov, 1988)
Duolandrevus sumatranus Gorochov, 1996
Duolandrevus tawau Gorochov, 2016
Duolandrevus unguiculatus Ma, Gorochov & Zhang, 2015
Duolandrevus yaeyamensis Oshiro, 1988
Duolandrevus yonaguniensis Ichikawa, 2001
Duolandrevus ziyunensis Zhang, Liu & Shi, 2017
 subgenus Jorama Otte, 1988 (synonym Neova Otte, 1988)
Duolandrevus amplus Gorochov, 2005
Duolandrevus bodemensis (Otte, 1988)
Duolandrevus curtipennis Chopard, 1937
Duolandrevus isagorensis (Otte, 1988)
Duolandrevus kotoshoensis Oshiro, 1989
Duolandrevus lombokensis Gorochov, 1996
Duolandrevus palawanensis (Otte, 1988)
Duolandrevus shilovi Gorochov, 1996
 subgenus Platylandrevus Gorochov, 2005
Duolandrevus depressus Gorochov, 2005
 subgenus Spinolandrevus Gorochov, 2000
Duolandrevus dohrni Gorochov, 2000
 subgenus Surdolandrevus Gorochov, 2003
Duolandrevus surdus Gorochov, 2003
 subgenus Vietlandrevus Gorochov, 1996
Duolandrevus imitator Gorochov, 2000
Duolandrevus minimus Gorochov, 1996
Duolandrevus sapidus (Gorochov, 1990)
 subgenus not assigned
Duolandrevus bicolor Bhowmik, 1981
Duolandrevus fruhstorferi Gorochov, 1996
Duolandrevus gigans Gorochov, 2016
Duolandrevus longipennis Chopard, 1968
Duolandrevus mjobergi Chopard, 1930
Duolandrevus nairi Vasanth, 1991
Duolandrevus palauensis Otte, 1988
Duolandrevus semialatus Chopard, 1930

References

External links
 

Ensifera genera
crickets
Orthoptera of Asia
Orthoptera of Indo-China